Ma and Pa Kettle on Vacation is a 1953 American comedy film directed by Charles Lamont.  It is the sixth installment of Universal-International's Ma and Pa Kettle series starring Marjorie Main and Percy Kilbride.

Plot
In May 1953, Ma and Pa Kettle are invited, by their daughter-in-law Kim's parents, Jonathan and Elizabeth Parker, to a trip to Paris. Leaving the kids with an Indian babysitter, Ma and Pa head out to France on an airplane. Upon arrival, Pa tries to buy racy postcards, and they get caught into a circle with a famous gang of spies, who want an envelope that is in Pa's possession.

Cast
Marjorie Main as Ma Kettle
Percy Kilbride as Pa Kettle
Ray Collins as Jonathan Parker
Barbara Brown as Elizabeth Parker
Bodil Miller as Inez Kraft
Sig Ruman as Cyrus Kraft
Oliver Blake as Geoduck
Teddy Hart as Crowbar
Ivan Triesault as Henri Dupre
Peter Brocco as Adolf Wade
Rosario Imperio as Apache Team (Indian babysitter)
 Uncredited players include Gino Corrado, Jean De Briac, Lawrence Dobkin, John Eldredge and Franklyn Farnum

References

External links

1953 films
Universal Pictures films
Films about vacationing
Films directed by Charles Lamont
Films scored by Herman Stein
American black-and-white films
Ma and Pa Kettle
Films set in Washington (state)
Films set in New York City
Films set in Paris
Films set in 1953
1953 comedy films
American comedy films
1950s English-language films
1950s American films